Hartham Common is a park in the county of Hertfordshire in the East of England. It is located between the town centre of the county town of Hertford and the elevated suburb of Bengeo.

Location
The park is situated in the valley of the River Lea and the River Beane, where the rivers' confluence is, at the eastern edge of the main field. The River Rib enters further east of the main field.

Facilities
Hartham Common is very sports-orientated, with many different sports being practiced in the area. A selection includes football, rugby, tennis, fishing, bowls, kayaking and canoeing. A full gym and swimming pool is located on the edge of the park next to Kallum Weir.

A large fenced children's play area provides a place for parents to take their young children, and an adjacent skatepark is available as well as a separate designated play area for older children.

Clubs and organisations
Organisations with physical presence on the common include:
 Hartham Pool and Gym
 Hertford Lawn Tennis Club
 Herts Canoe Club
 Sele Farm Bowls Club
 Hertford Basin – a marina for narrowboats.

Parks and open spaces in Hertfordshire